Bekmurod Oltiboev (born 17 June 1996) is an Uzbekistani judoka. At the 2018 Asian Games held in Jakarta, Indonesia, he won one of the bronze medals in the men's +100 kg event.

At the 2019 Military World Games held in Wuhan, China, he won the silver medal in the men's +100 kg event.

At the 2017 Islamic Solidarity Games held in Baku, Azerbaijan, he won one of the bronze medals in the men's +100 kg event. In 2021, he competed in the men's +100 kg event at the World Judo Championships in Budapest, Hungary. He also competed in the men's +100 kg event at the 2020 Summer Olympics held in Tokyo, Japan.

References

External links

Living people
1996 births
Place of birth missing (living people)
Uzbekistani male judoka
Judoka at the 2018 Asian Games
Medalists at the 2018 Asian Games
Asian Games bronze medalists for Uzbekistan
Asian Games medalists in judo
Islamic Solidarity Games medalists in judo
Islamic Solidarity Games competitors for Uzbekistan
Judoka at the 2020 Summer Olympics
Olympic judoka of Uzbekistan
21st-century Uzbekistani people